Filip Šitera (born 18 April 1988 in Mladá Boleslav, Czechoslovakia) is an international motorcycle speedway rider who has represented Czech Republic at Under-21 level. His uncles, Jan Verner and Václav Verner are both former Czech international riders. His grandfather and manager Miloslav Verner also rode.

Brief career summary
Despite showing an interest to ride in the UK, and attracting the attention of several British clubs,  Šitera ruled out riding in the UK from the start of 2008 due to racing and educational commitments but he signed for the Coventry Bees in July. He rides in Poland for Atlas Wrocław and signed a deal to ride in Sweden for Griparna in 2008.

Šitera travelled to Australia in 2007 where he would win the Jack Young Solo Cup at the Gillman Speedway in Adelaide, becoming the first (and so far only) Czech rider to win the cup named in honour of Adelaide's 1951 and 1952 Speedway World Champion.

In 2011 and 2012 he was a rider for King's Lynn Stars.

Career details

World Championships 
 Team World Championship (Speedway World Cup)
 2008 - 7th place (2 pts in Event 2)
 Individual U-21 World Championship
 2007 -  Ostrów Wlkp. - 9th place (8 pts)
 2008 -  Pardubice - 16th place (2 pts)
 2009 - track reserve in Semi-Final 2 Team U-21 World Championship (Under-21 Speedway World Cup)
 2005 -  Pardubice - 4th place (4 pts)
 2006 - 2nd place in Qualifying Round 2 2007 -  Abensberg - Bronze medal (11 pts)
 2008 - 2nd place in Qualifying Round 1 2009 -  Gorzów Wlkp. - 4th place (3 pts)

 European Championships 
 Individual European Championship
 2008 -  Lendava - 14th place (2 pts)
 Individual U-19 European Championship
 2004 -  Rybnik - 12th place (5 pts)
 2006 -  Goričan - 9th place (8 pts)
 2007 -  Częstochowa - Bronze medal (10+3 pts)
 European Pairs Championship
 2008 - started in Semi-Final 2 only European Club Champions' Cup:
 2007 - 3rd place in Semi-Final 2 (8 pts)''

Domestic competitions 
Individual U-21 Czech Championship
2005 - Silver medal
2006 - Czech Champion
Individual U-19 Czech Championship
2006 - Czech Champion
Individual New Zealand Championship
2006 - Bronze medal
Speedway Series in New Zealand
2006 - 3rd place
Ivan Mauger Golden Helmet
2006 - Winner

See also 
Czech Republic speedway team

References

External links 
Šitera's website (defunct, archived version)

1988 births
Living people
Czech speedway riders
Coventry Bees riders
Sportspeople from Mladá Boleslav